Ernst Endl (25 December 1929 – 13 May 2000) was an Austrian water polo player. He competed in the men's tournament at the 1952 Summer Olympics.

References

External links

1929 births
2000 deaths
Austrian male water polo players
Olympic water polo players of Austria
Water polo players at the 1952 Summer Olympics
Place of birth missing
Place of death missing